Back to Back is a 1959 studio album by Johnny Hodges and Duke Ellington. It was followed by Side by Side (1959), recorded at the same sessions.

Track listing 
 "Wabash Blues" (Fred Meinken, Dave Ringle) – 6:22
 "Basin Street Blues" (Spencer Williams) – 8:05
 "Beale Street Blues" (W. C. Handy) – 7:40
 "Weary Blues" (Artie Matthews) – 6:50
 "St. Louis Blues" (Handy) – 5:45
 "Loveless Love" (Handy) – 6:05
 "Royal Garden Blues" (Clarence Williams, Spencer Williams) – 5:20

Personnel 
 Duke Ellington – piano
 Johnny Hodges – alto saxophone
 Harry "Sweets" Edison – trumpet
 Les Spann – guitar
 Al Hall – bass (tracks 1 and 4) 
 Sam Jones – bass (tracks 2, 3, 5, 6, 7)
 Jo Jones – drums

The tracks with Sam Jones were recorded February 20, 1959, while those with Al Hall were recorded 6 days later. A Fresh Sound CD adds the 3 tracks from Side by Side with this same group.

Notes 

1959 albums
Duke Ellington albums
Johnny Hodges albums
Verve Records albums
Albums produced by Norman Granz